Nandita Das (born 23 October 1969) is an Indian National Congress politician from the state of Assam, India. She is a two time member of Assam Legislative Assembly. She won 2016 and 2021 assembly election from Boko constituency.

Nandita Das was appointed president of Assam Pradesh Mahila Congress Committee on 3 January 2019.

References 

Assam MLAs 2021–2026
Indian National Congress politicians from Assam
Assam MLAs 2016–2021
Politicians from Guwahati
1969 births
Living people